Henry Bannerman Morrison (20 September 1850 — 10 November 1913) was a Scottish-born New Zealand cricketer who played for Otago. He was born in Glasgow and died in Burgess Hill, Sussex.

A batsman and medium-pace bowler, Henry Morrison played for Southland against the English touring team in March 1877, winning the prize for the best fieldsman in the match. A year later, against the Australian touring team, he took 6 for 87. He later made a single first-class appearance for Otago, during the 1880–81 season, against Canterbury. From the lower-middle order, he scored 17 runs in the first innings in which he batted, and a duck in the second, as Otago lost the match by an innings.

See also
 List of Otago representative cricketers

References

External links
Henry Morrison at Cricket Archive 

1850 births
1913 deaths
New Zealand cricketers
Otago cricketers
Cricketers from Glasgow
British emigrants to New Zealand